Jacek Cyran (born 13 February 1979) is a Polish judoka.

Achievements

References

1979 births
Living people
Polish male judoka
Place of birth missing (living people)
21st-century Polish people